Silipo is a surname. Notable people with the surname include:

Carlo Silipo (born 1971), Italian water polo player
Joe Silipo (born 1957), Canadian and American football player
Tony Silipo (1957–2012), Canadian politician

See also
Filipo